Henry Whitworth Garden (23 August 1868 – 1949) was an Irish footballer who played in the Football League for Derby County. His only game for Derby came on the opening day of the 1892–93 season, a 3–1 victory against Stoke.

References

1868 births
1949 deaths
Irish association footballers (before 1923)
Association football defenders
English Football League players
Derby Midland F.C. players
Derby County F.C. players
Long Eaton Rangers F.C. players